Yonny Enrique Chirinos Mejias (born December 26, 1993) is a Venezuelan professional baseball pitcher for the Tampa Bay Rays of Major League Baseball (MLB).

Career

Minor league career 
Chirinos signed with the Tampa Bay Rays for $10,000 as an international free agent from Venezuela in June 2012. He made his professional debut in 2013 with the Venezuelan Summer League Rays and spent the whole season there, pitching to a 3–3 record and 3.27 ERA in 13 games (12 starts). In 2014, he played for the Princeton Rays where he compiled a 3–0 record and 2.09 ERA in 14 games, and in 2015, he pitched for the Charlotte Stone Crabs, Hudson Valley Renegades, and Bowling Green Hot Rods, collecting a combined 5–5 record, 1.82 ERA, and 1.02 WHIP in 15 games (13 starts). Chirinos spent 2016 with Bowling Green, Charlotte, and the Montgomery Biscuits, pitching to a 12–4 record and 3.36 ERA in 29 games. In 2017, Chirinos played for Montgomery and the Durham Bulls. He went 13–5 with a 2.73 ERA and 141 strikeouts and was named the Rays minor league pitcher of the year. The Rays added him to their 40-man roster after the season.

Tampa Bay Rays 
On March 25, 2018, the Rays announced that Chirinos had made the Opening Day roster. Chirinos made his opening debut in a long relief role against the Boston Red Sox on April 1. He worked four scoreless innings while allowing just one hit. Chirinos set a franchise record by pitching his first 14 2/3 innings without allowing an earned run. On May 1, Chirinos was placed on the 10-day disabled list with a right forearm strain. He was activated from the 10-day disabled list on June 4 but was optioned to Triple-A Durham. On July 24, the Rays recalled Chirinos to start against the New York Yankees. In his return, Chirinos pitched 6 2/3 innings, allowing three runs on six hits. In 18 games, 7 starts, he finished 5–5 in  innings. The following season, Chirinos split time between the bullpen and the rotation, appearing in 26 games (18 starts). He finished with a 9–5 record in  innings.

On August 21, 2020, it was announced that Chirinos would require Tommy John surgery for an elbow injury, ruling him out for the rest of the 2020 season and likely most of 2021. On August 25, 2020, he underwent the procedure. On February 22, 2021, Chirinos was placed on the 60-day injured list as he continued to recover from the surgery.

On March 22, 2022, Chirinos signed a $1.175 million contract with the Rays, avoiding salary arbitration.

References

External links

1993 births
Living people
Major League Baseball players from Venezuela
Venezuelan expatriate baseball players in the United States
Major League Baseball pitchers
Tampa Bay Rays players
Venezuelan Summer League Rays players
Princeton Rays players
Hudson Valley Renegades players
Bowling Green Hot Rods players
Charlotte Stone Crabs players
Montgomery Biscuits players
Bravos de Margarita players
Durham Bulls players